Bahadur is a 1953 Bollywood film.

Cast
Suresh
Shyama
Anwar Hussain

Music

References

External links

Films scored by S. Mohinder
1950s Hindi-language films